Samuel A. Culbert (born July 27, 1938) is a professor at UCLA Anderson School of Management, in the fields of organizational theory and applied behavioral science. He is known for his "trans-organizational" research methodology commentaries on workplace dynamics, identification of mismanagement practices, and theories on the sources of workplace-induced alienation.

Early life and education
Culbert acquired a systems-oriented logic studying for a B.S. in Industrial Engineering at Northwestern University (1961) and developed a clinician’s intuition and investigative skills earning a Ph.D. in Clinical Psychology at UCLA (1966). In tandem with clinical internships, Culbert joined up with business school social scientists researching the use of small group dynamics principles in conducting Sensitivity Training courses and workshops (T-groups).

In 1966, Culbert received a USPH United States Public Health Service Fellowship to summer intern with The NTL Institute for Applied Behavioral Science. On conclusion, he was recruited to serve as Program Director in Organization Studies and Director of Intern Training at NTL, positions deferred until 1967 due to UCLA teaching commitments. Concomitant to his NTL assignments, Culbert taught courses in three departments (Psychology, Education, and Government and Public Affairs) at George Washington University. 

After finishing his NTL assignment in 1969, Culbert returned to UCLA where he began what would become a 50-year professorship at the Anderson School of Management. Culbert was drawn to the human systems issues being explored by colleagues affiliating with The Quality of Working Life (QWL) movement -- an international network of researchers, theorists, social activists, and industrial leaders taking action to achieve a higher-order trans-organizational plane.

He has become known for his trans-organizational research methodology, commentaries on workplace dynamics, identification of mismanagement practices, and theorizing about the sources of workplace-induced alienation with human-system revisionary approaches for reducing them. Culbert's writings encourage the individual’s emancipation from organization and work-culture imposed constraints to effectiveness, promote the ever-present pursuit of self-awareness, authenticity, and other-sensitive interactions in life and work. Among these writings is “An Anatomy of Activism for Executives,” for which he and co-writer James Elden received the Harvard Business Review McKinsey Award.

Academic career
Culbert worked as an associate professorial lecturer at George Washington University from 1968-1969. He then returned to UCLA's Anderson School of Management as a professor in 1969.

His research interests involves the use of human-systems approaches associated with the Quality of working life (QWL) movement to improve corporate management.

Books 
Culbert has written and co-authored eight books on features of leadership, management, and professional participation in contemporary organizations.

The Organization Trap and How to Get Out of It (1974). Basic Books 
The Invisible War: Pursuing Self-Interests at Work (1980). with John J. McDonough, John Wiley 
Radical Management: Power Politics and The Pursuit of Trust (1985) with John J. McDonough. The Free Press. 
Mindset Management: The Heart of Leadership (1996). Oxford University Press. 
Samuel A. Culbert; John B. Ullmen. (2001) Don’t Kill the Bosses! Escaping the Hierarchy Trap. Berrett-Koehler Publishers. 
Samuel A. Culbert. (2008) Beyond Bullsh*t: Straight-Talk at Work. Stanford University Press.  SmartMoney's Top 10 Reads picks and finalist for the 2008 National Best Book Awards.
Samuel A. Culbert with Lawrence Rout (2010) Get Rid of the Performance Review! How Companies Can Stop Intimidating, Start Managing, and Focus on Getting Results. Business Plus (Hachette). 
Samuel A. Culbert (2017) Good People, Bad Managers: How Work Culture Corrupts Good Intentions. Oxford University Press.

References

External links 

Samuel Culbert UCLA Anderson website

Living people
UCLA Anderson School of Management faculty
Northwestern University alumni
George Washington University faculty
American writers
1938 births